Abell 1413 is a galaxy cluster in the Abell catalogue. The Abell catalogue was published by George O. Abell in 1958 while working on his PhD at California Institute of Technology. The catalogue has two different surveys. The Northern survey was done first by Abell in 1958 with the help of A.G. Wilson. The Northern Survey has 2,712 clusters, and in order for a cluster to be put into the catalogue it must pass four criteria. The first criterion is richness, and Abell divided the clusters into 6 different richness groups. Group 0 was 30-49 galaxies, Group 1 was 50-79 galaxies, Group 2 was 80-129 galaxies, Group 3 was 130 to 199 galaxies, Group 4 was 200-299 galaxies, and Group 5 was more than 299 galaxies. The second criterion was compactness. To meet this requirement a cluster must have 50 or more members in one counting radius of the cluster's center. The third criterion is distance. A cluster must have a nominal redshift between .02 and .2, which means a recessional velocity is between 6,000 and 60,000 km/s. The fourth and final criterion was galactic latitude. Areas around the milky way were excluded because it was difficult to identify galaxy clusters. The Southern survey was done in 1989 and added 1,361 clusters using the same criteria as the Northern Survey.

Abell 1413 is located 2 billion light years away from Earth between the constellations of Leo and Coma Berenices. It is one of 4,073 clusters of galaxies at redshift (meaning they are moving away from earth,) that are somewhat close to the Earth. Abell 1413 holds about 300 galaxies together with its strong gravity. Due to the strong interactions in the cluster, the material is heated up to 100 million degrees. Because of this intense heat, strong X-ray radiation is emitted from the cluster. Scientists using the Canada-France-Hawaii telescope observed Abell 1413 and built a sample of over 250 galaxies. These scientists consider Abell 1413 relaxed even though it has a highly elliptical shape. The scientists also concluded that the cluster ellipticity at large radii is around .35 while the cluster ellipticity at the center is about .8, and that the cluster is aligned in the North-South direction, a few degrees westward.

See also
 List of Abell clusters

References

1413
Galaxy clusters
Abell richness class 3
Leo (constellation)
Coma Berenices